This is a list of schools in the Metropolitan Borough of Tameside in the English county of Greater Manchester.

State-funded schools

Primary schools

Aldwyn Primary School, Audenshaw
Arlies Primary School, Stalybridge
Arundale Primary School, Mottram in Longdendale
Ashton West End Primary Academy, Ashton-under-Lyne
Audenshaw Primary School, Audenshaw
Bradley Green Primary Academy, Newton
Broadbent Fold Primary School and Nursery, Dukinfield
Broadbottom CE Primary School, Broadbottom
Buckton Vale Primary School, Carrbrook
Canon Burrows CE Primary School, Ashton-under-Lyne
Canon Johnson CE Primary School, Ashton-under-Lyne
Corrie Primary School, Denton
Dane Bank Primary School, Dane Bank
Denton West End Primary School, Denton
Discovery Academy, Hattersley
Dowson Primary Academy, Hyde
Endeavour Primary Academy, Hyde
Fairfield Road Primary School, Droylsden
Flowery Field Primary School, Hyde
Gee Cross Holy Trinity CE Primary School, Gee Cross
Godley Community Primary Academy, Godley
Gorse Hall Primary and Nursery School, Stalybridge
Greenfield Primary Academy, Hyde
Greenside Primary School, Droylsden
Greswell Primary School and Nursery, Denton
The Heys Primary School, Ashton-under-Lyne
Holden Clough Community Primary School, Ashton-under-Lyne
Hollingworth Primary School, Hollingworth
Holy Trinity CE Primary School, Ashton-under-Lyne
Hurst Knoll St James' CE Primary School, Ashton-under-Lyne
Inspire Academy, Ashton-under-Lyne
Linden Road Academy, Denton
Livingstone Primary School, Mossley
Lyndhurst Community Primary School, Dukinfield
Manchester Road Primary Academy, Droylsden
Manor Green Primary Academy, Haughton Green
Micklehurst All Saints CE Primary School, Mossley
Millbrook Primary School, Stalybridge
Milton St John's CE Primary School, Mossley
Moorside Primary School, Droylsden
Mottram CE Primary School, Mottram in Longdendale
Oakfield Primary School, Hyde
Oasis Academy Broadoak, Ashton-under-Lyne
Our Lady of Mount Carmel RC Primary School, Ashton-under-Lyne
Parochial CE Primary School, Ashton-under-Lyne
Pinfold Primary School, Hattersley
Poplar Street Primary School, Audenshaw
Ravensfield Primary School, Dukinfield
Rosehill Methodist Primary Academy, Ashton-under-Lyne
Russell Scott Primary School, Denton
St Anne's Primary School, Denton
St Anne's RC Primary School, Audenshaw
St Christopher's RC Primary School, Ashton-under-Lyne
St George's CE Primary School, Hyde
St George's CE Primary School, Mossley
St James' CE Primary School, Ashton-under-Lyne
St James' RC Primary School, Hattersley
St John Fisher RC Primary School, Haughton Green
St John's CE Primary School, Dukinfield
St Joseph's RC Primary School, Mossley
St Mary's CE Primary School, Droylsden
St Mary's RC Primary School, Denton
St Mary's RC Primary School, Dukinfield
St Paul's CE Primary School, Stalybridge
St Paul's RC Primary School, Hyde
St Peter's CE Primary School, Ashton-under-Lyne
St Peter's RC Primary School, Stalybridge
St Raphael's RC Primary School, Millbrook
St Stephen's CE Primary School, Audenshaw
St Stephen's RC Primary School, Droylsden
Silver Springs Primary Academy, Stalybridge
Stalyhill Infant School, Stalybridge
Stalyhill Junior School, Stalybridge
Waterloo Primary School, Ashton-under-Lyne
Wild Bank Primary School, Stalybridge
Yew Tree Primary School, Dukinfield

Secondary schools

Alder Community High School, Gee Cross
All Saints Catholic College, Dukinfield
Audenshaw School, Audenshaw
Copley Academy, Stalybridge
Denton Community College, Denton
Droylsden Academy, Droylsden
Fairfield High School for Girls, Droylsden
Great Academy Ashton, Ashton-under-Lyne
Hyde High School, Hyde
Laurus Ryecroft, Droylsden
Longdendale High School, Hollingworth
Mossley Hollins High School, Mossley
Rayner Stephens High School, Dukinfield
St Damian's RC Science College, Ashton-under-Lyne
St Thomas More RC College, Denton
West Hill School, Stalybridge

Special and alternative schools
Cromwell High School, Dukinfield
Hawthorns School, Audenshaw
Oakdale School, Dukinfield
Samuel Laycock School, Ashton-under-Lyne
Tameside Pupil Referral Service, Dukinfield
Thomas Ashton School, Hyde

Further education
Ashton Sixth Form College, Ashton-under-Lyne
Clarendon Sixth Form College, Ashton-under-lyne
Tameside College, Ashton-under-Lyne

Independent schools

Senior and all-through schools
Trinity School, Stalybridge

Special and alternative schools
Ashlea House School, Denton
Brambles School, Mottram in Longdendale
Greater Manchester Alternative Provision, Ashton-under-Lyne
Lawrence House, Park Bridge
The Limes Meadow School, Ashton-under-Lyne
Safe Start Education, Ashton-under-Lyne

References

 Tameside Council Schools List
 Ofsted (Office for Standards in Education)

 
Tameside